The white-spotted mannikin (Mayrimunia leucosticta) is a small passerine bird in the family Estrildidae. It is endemic to southern New Guinea.

This species has sometimes been considered as a subspecies of the streak-headed mannikin. The species is monotypic.

References

white-spotted mannikin
Birds of New Guinea
white-spotted mannikin
Taxa named by Luigi D'Albertis
Taxobox binomials not recognized by IUCN